Lophomerum is a genus of fungi within the Rhytismataceae family. The genus contains six species.

References

External links
Lophomerum at Index Fungorum

Leotiomycetes